Delft Island Fort (locally known as Neduntheevu fort and Meekaman fort) are ruins of a fort located on the island of Neduntheevu in the Palk Strait in northern Sri Lanka.

Traditionally attributed to the Karaiyar king Meekaman, the fort was probably built by the Portuguese. Later, it was taken over by Dutch, who built a barrack nearby. The island was known to the Portuguese as Ilha das Vacas ("Island of the Cows"), was renamed by the Dutch as Delft Island.

The fort was constructed out of limestone and coral. Though now in ruins, Ralph Henry Bassett describes the fort as a "very strongly fortified fort" in his book Romantic Ceylon: Its History, Legend, and Story.

References 

 

Dutch forts in Sri Lanka
Forts in Northern Province, Sri Lanka
Neduntheevu
Portuguese forts in Sri Lanka
Archaeological protected monuments in Jaffna District